Rudy Ralston (born Prague) was a Czech-American film producer. The brother of figure skater turned actress Vera Ralston, who was married to the head of Republic Pictures Herbert Yates, he was employed by Republic Pictures, making B westerns during the 1950s.

Filmography
 Buckaroo Sheriff of Texas (1951)
 The Dakota Kid (1951)
 Arizona Manhunt (1951)
 Wild Horse Ambush (1952)
 Thundering Caravans (1952)
 Desperadoes' Outpost (1952)
 El Paso Stampede (1953)
 Shadows of Tombstone (1953)
 Savage Frontier (1953)
 Bandits of the West (1953)
 Marshal of Cedar Rock (1953)
 Down Laredo Way (1953)
 Red River Shore (1953)
 Phantom Stallion (1954)
 Crooked Ring (1955)
 No Man's Woman (1955)
 Terror at Midnight (1956)
 Hell's Crossroads (1957)
 The Last Stagecoach West (1957)
 The Crooked Circle (1957)
 The Lawless Eighties (1957)
 Gunfire at Indian Gap (1957)
 The Notorious Mr. Monks (1958)
 The Man Who Died Twice (1958)

References

Bibliography
 Roberts, Randy John Wayne: American. University of Nebraska Press, 1997.

External links

Year of birth unknown
Year of death unknown
American film producers
Czech film producers
Czechoslovak emigrants to the United States
Mass media people from Prague